Longford & Exhall was a small railway station serving the areas of Longford and Exhall, to the north of Coventry, England, on the Coventry to Nuneaton Line, built by the London and North Western Railway. The station was opened in 1850, along with the line, and was the first to be closed, closing on 23 May 1949.

It was located at the point where the railway line crossed over Woodshires Road.

References

External links
Warwickshire Railways: Longford and Exhall Railway Station

Disused railway stations in Coventry
Railway stations in Great Britain opened in 1850
Railway stations in Great Britain closed in 1949
Former London and North Western Railway stations